is a Japanese former ice hockey player. He competed in the men's tournament at the 1960 Winter Olympics.

References

External links
  

1930 births
Possibly living people
Japanese ice hockey players
Olympic ice hockey players of Japan
Ice hockey players at the 1960 Winter Olympics
Sportspeople from Hokkaido